Delaware Township is an inactive township in Shannon County, in the U.S. state of Missouri.

Delaware Township was established in 1870, and named after the Delaware people.

References

Townships in Missouri
Townships in Shannon County, Missouri